Supreme Court of Georgia may refer to:

 Supreme Court of Georgia (country)
 Supreme Court of Georgia (U.S. state)